Mehdi Jafarpour (born 20 August 1984) is an Iranian footballer who currently plays for Saba Qom.

Club career
Mehdi Jafarpour has scored important goals for Sepahan in the 2009–10 Iran Pro League season.

In Week 4, he scored in the 14th minute, which ended up being the winner against Esteghlal Ahvaz. The match ended 4-1 for Sepahan. In Week 9, He scored the equalizer against Saipa in the 41st minute, to counter Karim Ansarifard's first goal. The match ended Sepahan 2–2 Saipa.

Club career statistics
.

 Assist Goals

Honours

Club
Iran's Premier Football League
Winner: 3
2009/10 with Sepahan
2010/11 with Sepahan
2011/12 with Sepahan
Hazfi Cup
Winner: 1
2012/13 with Sepahan

External links
Persian League Profile

1984 births
Living people
Iranian footballers
Pas players
Sepahan S.C. footballers
Saipa F.C. players
Persepolis F.C. players
People from Qaem Shahr
Association football midfielders
Association football fullbacks
Sportspeople from Mazandaran province